The Eurasian nuthatch (Sitta europaea) is a small passerine bird found throughout temperate Asia and in Europe. There are more than 20 subspecies, but the precise number depends on how small differences between populations are evaluated. This article follows the 2013 Handbook of the Birds of the World Alive treatment, which has more recognised forms than the 1996 Tits, Nuthatches and Treecreepers. Given the similarities between geographical forms of the Eurasian nuthatch, subspecies boundaries are somewhat fluid, although fewer than half as many are recognised now as in 1967.

The Eurasian nuthatch taxa can be divided into three main groups; the S. e. caesia group of Europe, North Africa and the Middle East, the S. e. europaea group of Scandinavia, Russia, Japan and northern China and the S. e. sinensis group of southern and eastern China and Taiwan. These may have been geographically isolated from each other until relatively recently. Birds of intermediate appearance occur where the group ranges overlap. The descriptions below are of the male. The female is usually slightly duller with a brown tint to the eyestripe and paler underparts, although the sexes are very similar in the S. e. sinensis group.

S. e. caesia group
The S. e. caesia group is found in much of Europe, as well as North Africa and the Middle East. Members of the subspecies group have buff breast and a white throat.

S. e. europaea group
The S. e. europaea group is found in Scandinavia and Russia, through to Japan and northern China. Members of the group have a white breast.

S. e. sinensis group
Subspecies in the S. e. sinensis group are found in south and east China, as well as Taiwan. They have a buff breast and throat.

Notes

References

'
'
Eurasian nuthatch